Customs Officer Bom (Swedish: Tull-Bom) is a 1951 Swedish comedy film directed by Lars-Eric Kjellgren and starring Nils Poppe, Inga Landgré and Gunnar Björnstrand.

The film's sets were designed by the art director Nils Svenwall.

Synopsis
A customs officer leads the search for a missing young woman.

Cast
 Nils Poppe as Fabian Bom  
 Inga Landgré as Frida  
 Gunnar Björnstrand as Frans Melin, aka Hamn-Casanova  
 Jan Molander as Urban Karlsson 
 Marianne Löfgren as Aurora  
 Harry Ahlin as Ingemar Berglund  
 Fritiof Billquist as Johansson  
 Ulla Norgren as Aina 
 Nils Hallberg as Kalle Värst  
 Alf Östlund as Skakis  
 Olav Riégo as Head of Customs  
 Arne Lindblad as Hugo Larsson 
 Margit Andelius as Miss Agnelius, the new secretary  
 Bisse Andersson as Dancer 
 Eddy Andersson as French policeman 
 Wiktor Andersson as Night watchman at the funfair  
 Karin Appelberg-Sandberg as Tickert woman at the variety  
 Gunwer Bergkvist as Young woman  
 Barbro Boman as French singer at Coq d'Or in Le Havre  
 Ivan Bousé as Jean, French smuggler  
 Knut Burgh as Man with stockings to declare  
 Nils Croona as Smuggler  
 Doreen Denning as French girl  
 Einar Eriksson as Waiter at Coq d'Or in Le Havre  
 Michael Fant as Customs officer  
 Siegfried Fischer as Archivist at the customs office  
 Anna-Lisa Fröberg as Woman with cloth to declare  
 Thomas Gistedt as Aurora's son  
 Herman Greid as German  
 Freddy Groneman as German customs officer  
 Mary Gräber as American tourist's wife 
 Emil Halberg as Danish customs officer  
 Gustaf Hiort af Ornäs as Custom officer 
 Karl-Arne Holmsten as Narrator (voice) 
 Gösta Holmström as Policeman at the docks  
 Ingemar Jacobsson as Policeman at the docks  
 Gunnar Johansson as Policeman at warehouse no. 15 
 Sten-Morris Johansson as Aurora's son  
 Ludde Juberg as Traveller with a bottle to declare  
 Sven-Lennart Karlsson as Aurora's son  
 Arne Källerud  Sailor on 'Stella'  
 Torsten Lilliecrona as French prison guard  
 Lennart Lindberg as First mate on 'Stella' 
 Carl-Gustaf Lindstedt as Radio officer at 'Stella'  
 Calle Lindström as Aurora's son  
 Gösta Lycke as Swedish customs officer  
 Börje Mellvig as French police inspector  
 Börje Nyberg as Customs officer  
 Verner Oakland as American tourist in a cabriolet  
 John Roos as Dutch customs officer  
 Birger Sahlberg as Man at the show at the funfair 
 Walter Sarmell as A man  
 Henrik Schartau as Sailor on 'Stella'  
 Henrik Schildt as French policeman 
 Gurli Swahn as Dancer 
 Katarina Taikon as Girl at Coq d'Or in Le Havre  
 Olle Teimert as Customs officer  
 Carl-Mats Törnblom as Aurora's son  
 Alexander von Baumgarten as Jacques, French smuggler  
 Peter Winner as French prison guard 
 Bo Wärff as Customs officer  
 Fylgia Zadig as Sonja at 47:ans Café  
 Curt 'Minimal' Åström as Desk clerk at the customs office

References

Bibliography 
 Per Olov Qvist & Peter von Bagh. Guide to the Cinema of Sweden and Finland. Greenwood Publishing Group, 2000.

External links 
 

1951 films
1951 comedy films
Swedish comedy films
1950s Swedish-language films
Films directed by Lars-Eric Kjellgren
Swedish black-and-white films
1950s Swedish films